In relation to biomechanics, the aggregate modulus (Ha) is a measurement of the stiffness of a material at equilibrium when fluid has ceased flowing through it. The aggregate modulus can be calculated from Young's modulus (E) and the Poisson ratio (v).

The aggregate modulus of a similar specimen is determined from a unidirectional deformational testing configuration, i.e., the only non-zero strain component is E11. This configuration is opposed to the Young's modulus, which is determined from a unidirectional loading testing configuration, i.e., the only non-zero stress component is, say, in the e1 direction.  In this test, the only non-zero component of the stress tensor is T11.

References 
Biomechanics
Motor control
Physical quantities